Richard Lush is a British-born Australian recording engineer and producer. He began his career in the mid-1960s as an assistant engineer at the EMI Abbey Road Studios in London.

Working alongside producer Sir George Martin and senior engineer Geoff Emerick, Lush participated in nearly one hundred Beatles recording sessions and he is credited as Second Engineer on all tracks on the Sgt Pepper's Lonely Hearts Club Band album.

Lush moved to Australia in the 1970s. In 1975, he took over from Richard Batchens as the producer for leading Australian pop band Sherbet; among his credits with them is the group's Australian Number 1 hit "Howzat" (1976), which was also a top 10 hit in the UK.

He produced the single "Night People" / "Superstar" for Herb McQuay which was recorded at Mandrill Studios in Auckland.

Among his more recent credits, Lush engineered and/or mixed numerous tracks for the official CD album of music from the Sydney 2000 Olympics, released by Sony Music Australia.

Awards

King of Pop Awards
The King of Pop Awards were voted by the readers of TV Week. The King of Pop award started in 1967 and ran through to 1978.

|-
| 1976
| himself
| Best Australian Record Producer
| 
|-

References

Living people
English record producers
English audio engineers
English expatriates in Australia
Australian audio engineers
Australian record producers
Year of birth missing (living people)